BlueNC is a progressive community website focused on North Carolina politics. Its front page blog is its central feature, and includes posts written by BlueNC regulars and posts promoted to the front page through group moderation. The site also features an events calendar, a forum, and an action center, where users can send off letters to the editor and contact their State and federal representatives.

Notable Guest Appearances 

Blog entries by North Carolina Congressman Brad Miller (NC-13).
BlueNC interview with North Carolina Congressman David Price (NC-04).
Blog entries by Congressional Candidate Larry Kissell (NC-08).
BlueNC interview with Larry Kissell.

External links 
BlueNC
The Revolution Will Be Blogged, including coverage of BlueNC by North Carolina weekly the Independent.
Pols take advantage of Web of opportunity from the Charlotte Observer, May 29, 2006 (reproduced at Larry Kissell's campaign site).

Politics of North Carolina
American social networking websites
American political websites